The , or more commonly referred to simply as the , are a group of mountains in central Hokkaidō, Japan.

List of peaks
Mount Ishikari
Mount Otofuke
Mount Mikuni
Mount Yuniishikari
Mount Numanohara

Geography
These mountains border Tokachi-Mitsumata Caldera to the south and Nipesotsu-Maruyama Volcanic Group to the southwest.

Mountain ranges of Hokkaido